Hugo Torres Sapp (born 12 September 1973), best known by his ring name Máscara Sagrada Jr., is a Mexican Luchador. He is best known for appearing in the Asistencia Asesoría y Administración (AAA) promotion. While he portrays a storyline relative of Máscara Sagrada, they are not related.

Máscara Sagrada Jr. has worked under various ring names such as Aguila de Acero, Directo, Emo Extreme, Máscara Jr., Super AAA, and Muerte Roja. He is a former holder of the Mexican National Middleweight Championship and co-holder the Mexican National Atómicos Championship along with Blue Demon Jr., La Parka Jr. and Perro Aguayo Jr.

Championships and accomplishments 
Lucha Libre AAA Worldwide
 Mexican National Middleweight Championship (1 time)
Mexican National Atómicos Championship (1 time) with Blue Demon Jr., La Parka Jr. and Perro Aguayo Jr. (1)

References

External links 
 

1973 births
Living people
Masked wrestlers
Mexican male professional wrestlers
Mexican National Middleweight Champions